Stephen Robson (born 1 April 1951) is a prelate of the Catholic Church. , he is the Bishop Emeritus of Dunkeld.

From 2012 to 2014 he was auxiliary bishop of the Archdiocese of St Andrews and Edinburgh.

Early life
Stephen Robson was born in Carlisle, in the Diocese of Lancaster, on 1 April 1951. Baptised in the Anglican tradition on 15 May 1951, he became a Roman Catholic while a teenager. After secondary school he attended the University of Edinburgh where he obtained a degree in biological sciences with a specialisation in medical technology at Napier College of Science in Edinburgh. He was heavily influenced by the local Jesuit community while studying in Edinburgh.

Formation and further studies
Robson completed his studies for ordination at St Andrew's College, Drygrange. During his ministry at the Pontifical Scots College in Rome he gained a Licentiate and Doctorate in Spiritual Theology and a Licentiate in Canon Law at the Pontifical Gregorian University. 

In 2004, his doctoral thesis, entitled "With the Spirit and Power of Elijah: The Prophetic-reforming Spirituality of Bernard of Clairvaux as Evidenced Particularly in His Letters", was awarded the Gregorian University's Bellarmine Medal (Theology), awarded to recognise the best thesis submitted each year in theology. Cistercian P. Alkuin Schachenmayr wrote that "dozens of passages in Robson’s dissertation" seemed identical to passages published by other authors, yet without giving them proper attribution. An investigation by the Gregorian cleared Robson of these charges in 2020. 

In 2021, philosopher M.V. Dougherty identified multiple further examples of plagiarism in Robson's monograph and raised concerns about the thoroughness and independence of the Gregorian's investigation.

Priesthood
Robson was ordained deacon on 12 February 1978, and priest on 17 March 1979 for the Archdiocese of St Andrews and Edinburgh.

He subsequently held the following pastoral assignments:
Parochial Vicar at St. Mary's, Kirkcaldy (1979–1981)
Tutor at St Mary's College, Blairs (1980–1986)
Assistant at the Department for Religious Education in Edinburgh then Episcopal Vicar and Director of the same (1987–1993)
Pastor at Our Lady and St Margaret's, Duns (1988–1989)
Pastor at Our Lady of the Waves', Dunbar (1990–1993)
Pastor at St John Vianney's, Gilmerton. Edinburgh (1993–1997)

Following his period at St Mary's College, Blairs, he spent over a year living at Ampleforth Abbey while discerning a vocation to monastic life

From 1998 to 2006 he was the spiritual director of the Pontifical Scots College in Rome.

On returning to Scotland he became Chancellor of the Archdiocese of Saint Andrews and Edinburgh and pastor of the united parishes of Our Lady's in North Berwick and Dunbar. He also served as a judge of the Scottish National Catholic Tribunal.

Episcopal Ministry

Auxiliary bishop
Robson's appointment was announced on 8 May 2012 by Pope Benedict XVI and he received episcopal consecration on 9 June 2012, the Feast of St Columba, from Keith Patrick Cardinal O'Brien with Archbishops Antonio Mennini and Mario Conti serving as co-consecrators. He was assigned the titular see of Tunnuna in Tunisia.

Immediately following his episcopal consecration he served as the representative of the Bishops' Conference of Scotland at the 50th International Eucharistic Congress in Dublin from 10–17 June 2012.
cC
As auxiliary bishop, Robson became a member of the bishops' conference. Following his episcopal ordination, he continued Chancellor of the archdiocese and served as parish priest at Ss John Cantius and Nicholas, Broxburn, beginning in September 2012.

When Cardinal O'Brien resigned in February 2013 after being accused of sexual misconduct by other priests, Robson was named apostolic administrator and entrusted with running the daily affairs of the archdiocese. Robson and O'Brien had been close for over 30 years; they met while colleagues on the staff of St Mary’s College, Blairs. Robson had been O'Brien's private secretary.

In March 2013 Robson was appointed to be one of the twelve members of the controversial McLellan Commission, which was to review how the Scottish Church deals with accusations of sexual abuse; Kevin McKenna of The Guardian called its August 2015 report a "whitewash".

Bishop of Dunkeld
On 11 December 2013, Robson was appointed as Bishop of Dunkeld by Pope Francis. He was installed in St Andrew's Cathedral, Dundee, on 9 January 2014. He announced his resignation on 28 December 2022, citing ill health.

Apostleship of the Sea
In February 2015, Robson was appointed Bishop Promoter and a Trustee of Catholic seafarers' charity Apostleship of the Sea.

References

External links

1951 births
Converts to Roman Catholicism from Anglicanism
Living people
Alumni of the University of Edinburgh
Pontifical Gregorian University alumni
21st-century Roman Catholic bishops in Scotland
Roman Catholic titular bishops of Tunnuna
Bishops of Dunkeld (Roman Catholic, Post-Reformation)
English Roman Catholic bishops